Salima Airport  is an airport serving the town of Salima, Republic of Malawi.

See also
Transport in Malawi
List of airports in Malawi

References

 Google Earth

External links
Salima Airport
OpenStreetMap - Salima
OurAirports - Salima

Airports in Malawi
Buildings and structures in Central Region, Malawi